The Cantidiano Valqueiro Barros Private Natural Heritage Reserve is a private natural heritage reserve in the state of Pernambuco, Brazil. It protects an area of dry caatinga vegetation.

Location

The Cantidiano Valqueiro Barros Private Natural Heritage Reserve is in the municipality of Floresta, Pernambuco.

History

The owner of the Tabuleiro Comprido farm, Natanael Valgueiro Barros, was opposed to hunting and deforestation.
He raised cattle, sheep and goats on the land, which also supports a flock of emus, now much reduced in size by hunters.
The National Institute for Colonization and Agrarian Reform (INCRA) declared that the farm was unproductive, and threatened to expropriate and develop it.
The environmental group SOS Caatinga and others helped with a campaign against INCRA's proposal, calling it an environmental disaster to clear the well-preserved caatinga.
They gained the support of the federal representative of the RPPN program in Pernambuco.

The Cantidiano Valqueiro Barros Private Natural Heritage Reserve was recognized by Romulus Melo, president of the Brazilian Institute of Environment and Renewable Natural Resources (IBAMA), by ordnance 177 on 31 December 2002.
The ordnance was published on 3 January 2003.
The RPPN is the second in the Pernambuco caatinga, the first being the Maurício Dantas RPPN.
It became part of the Caatinga Ecological Corridor, created in 2006.

Environment

The Köppen climate classification is Bs s'h', with a long dry season from April to October and a short rainy season from November to March.
The reserve protects an area of caatinga vegetation, most of it found in depressions between the plateau areas.
Plants species include Amburana cearensis, Anadenanthera colubrina, Aspidosperma pyrifoliam, Cnidoscolus quercifolius and various species of Croton, Mimosa and Cactus.
Harris's hawk (Parabuteo unicinctus) and white-cheeked pintail (Anas bahamensis) were reported in the reserve in 2005.

Notes

Sources

Private natural heritage reserves of Brazil
Protected areas of Pernambuco
2003 establishments in Brazil